Galleons were large, multi-decked sailing ships first used as armed cargo carriers by European states from the 16th to 18th centuries during the age of sail and were the principal vessels drafted for use as warships until the Anglo-Dutch Wars of the mid-1600s. Galleons generally carried three or more masts with a lateen fore-and-aft rig on the rear masts, were carvel built with a prominent squared off raised stern, and used square-rigged sail plans on their fore-mast and main-masts.

Such ships were the mainstay of maritime commerce into the early 19th century, and were often drafted into use as auxiliary naval war vessels—indeed, were the mainstay of contending fleets through most of the 150 years of the Age of Exploration—before the Anglo-Dutch wars brought purpose-built ship-rigged warships, ships of the line, that thereafter dominated war at sea during the remainder of the age of sail.

Etymology
The word galleon, "large ship", comes from Old French galion, "armed ship of burden". or from (Castilian) Spanish galeón, "galleon", "armed merchant ship", (perhaps via Italian galeone, big galea, "big galley") from Medieval Greek galea, "galley", to which the French or Spanish augmentative suffix -on is added. Another possible origin is the Old French word galie, "galley"; also from Medieval Greek galea. The galea was a warship of the Byzantine navy, and its name may be related to the Greek word galeos, "dogfish shark". The term was originally given to certain types of war galleys in the Middle Ages.

The Annali Genovesi mention galleons of 60, 64 and 80 oars, used for battle and on missions of exploration, in the 12th and 13th centuries. It is very likely that the galleons and galliots mentioned in the accounts of the crusades were the same vessels. In the early 16th century, the Venetian galleoni were a new class of galley used to hunt down pirates in the Mediterranean Sea.

Later, when the term started to be applied to sail-only vessels, it meant, like the English term "man-of-war", any large warship that was otherwise no different from the other sailing ships of the time.

History
In the beginning of the 16th century, a lowering of the carrack's forecastle and elongation of the hull gave the ocean-going galleons an unprecedented level of stability in the water, and reduced wind resistance at the front, leading to a faster, more maneuverable vessel. The galleon differed from the older types primarily by being longer, lower and narrower, with a square tuck stern instead of a round tuck, and by having a snout or head projecting forward from the bows below the level of the forecastle. In Portugal at least, Portuguese carracks were usually very large ships for their time (often over 1,000 tons), while galleons were mostly under 500 tons, although the Manila galleons were to reach up to 2,000 tons. With the introduction of the galleon in Portuguese India Armadas during the first quarter of the 16th century, carracks' armament was reduced as they became almost exclusively cargo ships (which is why the Portuguese carracks were pushed to such large sizes), leaving any fighting to be done to the galleons. One of the largest and most famous of Portuguese galleons was the São João Baptista (nicknamed Botafogo, "Spitfire"), a 1,000-ton galleon built in 1534, said to have carried 366 guns.

Carracks also tended to be lightly armed and used for transporting cargo in all the fleets of other Western European states, while galleons were purpose-built warships, and were stronger, more heavily armed, and also cheaper to build (five galleons could cost around the same as three carracks) and were therefore a much better investment for use as warships or transports. There are disputes about its origins and development but each Atlantic sea power built types suited to its needs, while constantly learning from their rivals. It was the captains of the Spanish navy, Pedro Menéndez de Avilés and Álvaro de Bazán, who designed the definitive long and relatively narrow hulled galleon for Spain in the 1550s. 

The galleon was powered entirely by wind, using sails carried on three or four masts, with a lateen sail continuing to be used on the last (usually third and fourth) masts. They were used in both military and trade applications, most famously in the Spanish treasure fleet, and the Manila galleons. While carracks played the leading role in early global explorations, galleons also played a part in the 16th and 17th centuries. In fact, galleons were so versatile that a single vessel might be refitted for wartime and peacetime roles several times during its lifespan. The galleon was the prototype of all square-rigged ships with three or more masts for over two and a half centuries, including the later full-rigged ship.

The principal warships of the opposing English and Spanish fleets in the 1588 confrontation of the Spanish Armada and in the 1589 confrontation of the English Armada were galleons, with the modified English race-built galleons developed by John Hawkins proving their great utility in combat, while the capacious Spanish galleons, designed primarily as transports, showed great endurance in the battles.

Construction

Galleons were constructed from oak (for the keel), pine (for the masts) and various hardwoods for hull and decking. Hulls were usually carvel-built. The expenses involved in galleon construction were enormous. Hundreds of expert tradesmen (including carpenters, pitch-melters, blacksmiths, coopers, shipwrights, etc.) worked for months before a galleon was seaworthy. To cover the expense, galleons were often funded by groups of wealthy businessmen who pooled resources for a new ship. Therefore, most galleons were originally consigned for trade, although those captured by rival states were usually put into military service.

The most common gun used aboard a galleon was the demi-culverin, although gun sizes up to demi-cannon were possible.

Because of the long periods often spent at sea and poor conditions on board, many of the crew often perished during the voyage; therefore advanced rigging systems were developed so that the vessel could be sailed home by an active sailing crew a fraction of the size aboard at departure.

Distinguishing features

Galleons were a class of blue-water sailing ship that combined the easy-to-maneuver fore-and-aft rig of smaller shipping (boats) with the square rig of late middle ages cargo vessels. The galleons solidified the place of the square-rig and the centrally situated tallest main-masts and the slightly shorter fore-masts of a square-rigged ship characteristic of the 16th–19th centuries, but introduced the use of the lateen rig to sail closer to the wind on a tack than could a square-rigged vessel—an important attribute in restricted waters, but more so over long voyages where holding a few compass points closer to the wind might save hundreds of miles and days or weeks of sailing 'beating into the wind'.
 
The most distinguishing features of the galleon include the long, prominent beak or beakhead followed by a foremast and mainmast, both noticeably taller than the single or double lateen-rigged mizzenmasts with their sloped lateen-rig yards, and below those the square quarter gallery at the stern. On average with three masts, in larger galleons, a fourth mast was added, usually another lateen-rigged mizzen, called the bonaventure mizzen.

The galleon continued to be used into the 18th century, by which time purpose-built vessels such as the fluyt, the brig and the full-rigged ship, both as a trading vessel and ship of the line, rendered it obsolete for trade and warfare respectively.

The oldest English drawings
The oldest known scale drawings in England are in a manuscript called "Fragments of Ancient Shipwrightry" made in about 1586 by Mathew Baker, a master shipwright. This manuscript, held at the Pepysian Library, Magdalene College, Cambridge, provides an authentic reference for the size and shape of typical English galleons built during this period. Based on these plans, the Science Museum, London has built a 1:48 scale model ship that is an exemplar of galleons of this era.

Notable galleons

 São João Baptista, nicknamed Botafogo, the most powerful warship when launched (1534) by the Portuguese; became famous during the Conquest of Tunis (1535), where it was commanded by Luís of Portugal, Duke of Beja.
"La Galga", the Assateague Spanish galleon that was shipwrecked in 1794; according to legend, the ancestors of the now famous Chincoteague ponies swam ashore from its hold.
 Adler von Lübeck, the largest ship of its day when launched in 1566.
 The Manila galleons, Spanish trading ships that sailed once or twice per year across the Pacific Ocean between Manila in the Philippines and Acapulco in New Spain (now Mexico); (1565–1815).
 San Salvador, flagship vessel in Juan Rodríguez Cabrillo's 1542 exploration of present-day California in the United States.
 San Pelayo, the large 906-ton galleon, which served as the flagship of Pedro Menéndez de Avilés during his expedition to establish St. Augustine, Florida in 1565. The vessel was so large it could not enter St. Augustine's harbor, so Menendez ordered it offloaded and sent it back to Hispaniola. At a later date her crew mutinied and sailed to Europe where the ship wrecked off the coast of Denmark.
 Golden Hind, the ship in which Sir Francis Drake circumnavigated the globe 1577–1580.
 Dainty, ship with which Sir Richard Hawkins sought to emulate the circumnavigation voyage of his cousin Francis Drake. She was captured by the Spanish in the action of Atacames Bay in 1594 and served in the Spanish Navy in the South American Pacific for several years.
 Ark Raleigh was designed and built by Sir Walter Raleigh. She was later chosen by Lord Howard, admiral of the fleet to be the flagship of the English fleet in the fight against the Spanish Armada in 1588 and was summarily renamed Ark Royal.
 Revenge, a galleon built in 1577, the flagship of Sir Francis Drake in the Battle of the Spanish Armada in 1588, was captured by a Spanish fleet off Flores in the Azores in 1591 and sank while being sailed back to Spain.
 São Martinho, the Portuguese galleon, the flagship of Duke of Medina Sidonia, commander-in-chief of the Spanish Armada.
 Triumph, the largest Elizabethan galleon; flagship of Sir Martin Frobisher in the Battle of the Spanish Armada.
 San Juan Bautista (originally called Date Maru, 伊達丸 in Japanese). She crossed the Pacific Ocean from Japan to New Spain in 1614. She was of the Spanish galleon type, known in Japan as Nanban-Sen (南蛮船).
 Nuestra Señora de la Concepción, a Spanish galleon, known to her crew as Cacafuego for her strong cannon. She was captured by Sir Francis Drake in 1578 and all her treasures were brought to England. She was holding treasures mined in one year by the Spanish in the Americas.
 Padre Eterno, a Portuguese galleon launched in 1663. She was considered to be the biggest ship of her time, carrying 144 pieces of artillery with a displacement up to 2,000 tons.
Vasa, the only original galleon to be preserved. She sank in 1628 and was raised in 1961 for preservation as a museum ship.
Santa Luzia, a Portuguese galleon known for defeating a Dutch squadron single-handedly twice in 1650.

Notes

References 

 Alertz, U. (1991) Vom Schiffbauhandwerk zur Schiffbautechnik : die Entwicklung neuer Entwurfs- und Konstruktionsmethoden im italienischen Galeerenbau (1400–1700), Hamburg : Kovač, 
 Humble, R. and Bergin, M. (1993) A 16th century galleon, Inside story series, Hemel Hempstead : Simon & Schuster, 
 Kirsch, P. (1990) The Galleon: the great ships of the Armada era, London : Conway Maritime, 
 Rutland, J. (1988) A galleon, 2nd rev. ed., Connaty, M. (ed.), London : Kingfisher, 
 Serrano Mangas, F. (1992) Función y evolución del galeón en la carrera de Indias, Colección Mar y América 9, Madrid : Editorial MAPFRE,

External links

Galleon - World History Encyclopedia
the wreck of the San José, 1708. Royal Geographical Society of South Australia
The Development of the Full-Rigged Ship From the Carrack to the Full-Rigger

Merchant sailing ship types
Military history of Spain
Maritime history of Portugal
Exploration ships
Privateer ships
Ships attacked and captured by pirates